The Gospel According to Peanuts is a 1965 book written by Robert L. Short about Charles M. Schulz's Peanuts comic strip. The book is based on Short's use of the Peanuts characters to illustrate his lectures about the Christian Gospel.

The book was a best seller and sold over 10 million copies. Summary:

A 35th anniversary edition of 130 pages was released by Westminster John Knox Press in 2000, with a "new cover, a new interior design, and a new foreword by Martin E. Marty."

A sequel, The Parables of Peanuts, was written by Short in 1968. It was reissued in 2002 by HarperCollins Publishers. Summary:

About 25 years after the publication of the book, Short became a Presbyterian minister.

References

1965 books
Books about Christianity
Books about comics
Peanuts (comic strip)
Books by Robert L. Short